Red velvet may refer to:
Red velvet cake

Film and Theatre
Red Velvet (film), a 2008 film starring Henry Thomas and Kelli Garner
Red Velvet (play), a 2012 play by Lolita Chakrabarti

Music
Red Velvet (group), a South Korean girl group
Red Velvet – Irene & Seulgi, subunit formed in 2020
"Red Velvet" (song), a song written by Ian Tyson and recorded by Johnny Cash
"Red Velvet", a song from the OutKast album Stankonia

Other
Red velvetfish, Gnathanacanthus goetzeei
Red velvet mite, arachnid of the family Trombidiidae
Red velvet wrasse, Cirrhilabrus rubrisquamis
Red Velvet (wrestler), American professional wrestler